Dmitry Tursunov was the defending champion but decided not to participate.
Top seed Mikhail Kukushkin defeated surprise finalist qualifier Louk Sorensen in the final.

Seeds

Draw

Finals

Top half

Bottom half

References
 Main Draw
 Qualifying Draw

Turk Telecom Izmir Cup - Singles
2013 Singles